Jelena Janković was the defending champion, but lost in the second round against Peng Shuai.

Svetlana Kuznetsova won in the final 6–2, 6–4, against Agnieszka Radwańska to win the tournament for the second time.

This tournament saw a WTA tour record, with world No. 226 Zhang Shuai defeating then world No. 1 Dinara Safina in the second round, and as such becoming the lowest-ranked player to ever defeat a reigning world No. 1. Serena Williams replaced Safina as world No. 1 following the tournament by virtue of winning her second round match, though Williams herself would lose in the third round.

Seeds

The four Tokyo semifinalists received a bye into the second round. They are as follows:
  Maria Sharapova (third round)
  Agnieszka Radwańska (final)
  Li Na (third round)
  Jelena Janković (second round)

Draw

Finals

Top half

Section 1

Section 2

Bottom half

Section 3

Section 4

External links
 Main Draw
 Qualifying Draw

References

China Open - Women's Singles
2009 China Open (tennis)